Critical Horizons: A Journal of Philosophy and Social Theory is a peer-reviewed academic journal covering philosophy, aesthetics, and critical social theory. It is published by Routledge and the editors-in-chief are  Jay Bernstein, Jean-Philippe Deranty, Emmanuel Renault, and John Rundell. It was published by Brill Publishers in the past.

Abstracting and indexing
The journal is abstracted and indexed in:

Emerging Sources Citation Index
Philosophy Research Index 
The Philosopher's Index
Proquest databases
Sociological Abstracts
Scopus

References

External links
 

Routledge academic journals
Quarterly journals
English-language journals
Aesthetics journals
Publications established in 2000